Micropsyrassa meridionalis is a species of beetle in the family Cerambycidae. It was described by Martins in 1974.

References

Elaphidiini
Beetles described in 1974